Troy Bond (born 14 July 1973) is a premiership winning, former Australian rules footballer who played in the Australian Football League (AFL).

AFL career

Carlton career (1994–1995)
Originally from South Australian National Football League (SANFL) club Port Adelaide, Bond started his AFL career at the Carlton Football Club in 1994, where he played 36 games and kicked 26 goals. He played fifteen games in their record-breaking premiership year in 1995 but was dropped for the Grand Final. Bond travelled home to Adelaide on the day before the big game without saying a word to coach David Parkin or his teammates.

Adelaide career (1996–1999)
Bond was traded to Adelaide at the end of the 1995 season. He had a magnificent 1997 finals series, kicking 10 goals, including four goals in the grand final win. Bond struggled with hamstring injuries in the 1998 AFL season and only managed 10 games and missed out on the chance to play in back to back premierships due to a shoulder reconstruction. Bond yet again only played 10 games in an injury affected 1999 AFL season. In the first pre season with Gary Ayres as coach, Bond got as fit as he had ever been in preparation for playing in the midfield, however a hip injury ended his 94 AFL game career. He played 58 games and kicked 63 goals for the Crows.

Statistics

|-
|- style="background-color: #EAEAEA"
! scope="row" style="text-align:center" | 1994
|style="text-align:center;"|
| 8 || 21 || 25 || 15 || 137 || 73 || 210 || 42 || 25 || 1.2 || 0.7 || 6.5 || 3.5 || 10.0 || 2.0 || 1.2
|-
! scope="row" style="text-align:center" | 1995
|style="text-align:center;"|
| 8 || 15 || 1 || 11 || 88 || 34 || 122 || 25 || 7 || 0.1 || 0.7 || 5.9 || 2.3 || 8.1 || 1.7 || 0.5
|- style="background-color: #EAEAEA"
! scope="row" style="text-align:center" | 1996
|style="text-align:center;"|
| 18 || 20 || 14 || 12 || 234 || 120 || 354 || 74 || 21 || 0.7 || 0.6 || 11.7 || 6.0 || 17.7 || 3.7 || 1.1
|-
|style="text-align:center;background:#afe6ba;"|1997†
|style="text-align:center;"|
| 18 || 18 || 20 || 9 || 149 || 80 || 229 || 55 || 33 || 1.1 || 0.5 || 8.3 || 4.4 || 12.7 || 3.1 || 1.8
|- style="background-color: #EAEAEA"
! scope="row" style="text-align:center" | 1998
|style="text-align:center;"|
| 18 || 10 || 8 || 3 || 71 || 31 || 102 || 26 || 11 || 0.8 || 0.3 || 7.1 || 3.1 || 10.2 || 2.6 || 1.1
|-
! scope="row" style="text-align:center" | 1999
|style="text-align:center;"|
| 18 || 10 || 9 || 7 || 74 || 32 || 106 || 26 || 6 || 0.9 || 0.7 || 7.4 || 3.2 || 10.6 || 2.6 || 0.6
|- class="sortbottom"
! colspan=3| Career
! 94
! 77
! 57
! 753
! 370
! 1123
! 248
! 103
! 0.8
! 0.6
! 8.0
! 3.9
! 11.9
! 2.6
! 1.1
|}

Personal life
Bond's younger brother Shane also played AFL football, for the West Coast Eagles and Port Adelaide Football Club.

References 

Adelaide Football Club players
Adelaide Football Club Premiership players
Indigenous Australian players of Australian rules football
Australian rules footballers from South Australia
South Australian State of Origin players
Carlton Football Club players
Port Adelaide Magpies players
Port Adelaide Football Club (SANFL) players
Port Adelaide Football Club players (all competitions)
1973 births
Living people
One-time VFL/AFL Premiership players